Alec Jackson may refer to:

Alec Jackson (footballer, born 1921) (1921–2010), Scottish professional footballer
Alec Jackson (footballer, born 1937) (born 1937), English professional footballer

See also
Alex Jackson (disambiguation)